"Did It for Love" is a song recorded by American country music group Sawyer Brown.  Written by lead vocalist Mark Miller, it was released in March 1990 as the second single from the album The Boys Are Back.  The song reached #33 on the Billboard Hot Country Singles & Tracks chart.

Chart performance

References

1990 singles
1989 songs
Sawyer Brown songs
Songs written by Mark Miller (musician)
Capitol Records singles
Curb Records singles